The term All-on-4, also known as All‐on‐Four and All‐in‐Four, refers to 'all' teeth being supported 'on four' dental implants, a  prosthodontics procedure for total rehabilitation of the edentulous (toothless) patient, or for patients with badly broken down teeth, decayed teeth, or compromised teeth due to gum disease.  It consists of the rehabilitation of either edentulous or dentate maxilla and / or mandible with fixed prosthesis by placing four implants in the anterior maxilla, where bone density is higher.  The four implants support a fixed prosthesis with 10 to 14 teeth, and it is placed immediately, typically within 24 hours of surgery.

The All-On-Bar solution, with the latest technology, computer aid design/Mill (cad/cam) the all-on-4 has evolved including the All-on-bar concept, which is adding a milled titanium bar structure to the dental implants which helps keep them working together. Protecting the implants from failures even after the hybrid bridge is broken. this concept helps the clinician provide a better long-lasting solution, instead of a conversion-denture which is a chair side repair and modified denture. The All-On-Bar reduces the appointments, eliminating the Denture Conversion Temporary by replacing it with a long lasting hybrid, some patients keep this option as their final due to a lower budget or because the space is limited for other final solutions.

Pmma or Denture teeth over the titanium bar wears out over time and need replacement, this is a controversial topic since the Pmma has the advantage of been shuck absorbent. This helps the implants receive less stress during mastication forces but keeping a solid structure on the inside.many processionals think this is a better solution, keeping in mind that the bridge can be switch to a new one a few years after.   

Implant manufacturer Nobel Biocare AB of Gothenburg, Sweden, was among the first to identify the evolution of the All-on-4 technique as a potential valid and cost-effective alternative to conventional implant techniques, and funded studies by Portuguese dentist Paulo Maló to determine the efficacy of this approach.  During this time, this technique was also used by various other clinicians around the world.

All-on-4 is not an invention, but rather a treatment technique that has evolved over time, and has the following features:
four dental implants to support a full fixed bridge (documented since 1977)
the use of angulated implants in the back to overcome bony deficiencies or anatomical structures (documented since 1990)
immediate loading (documented since 1990)

The All-on-4 treatment concept is a prosthodontic procedure (i.e replacement of missing teeth) that provides a permanent, screw-retained, same-day replacement for the entire upper and / or lower set of teeth with a bridge or denture.  The procedure is best for patients with significant tooth loss or decay, and for people whose bone loss in the jaw area prevents them from getting conventionally oriented (vertical) dental implants.  Often, tooth loss is accompanied by loss of the jaw bone, which poses the problem of reconstruction of the jaw bone requiring bone grafting.  The All-on-4 technique takes advantage of the dense bone that remains in the front part of the jaws, and by placing the two posterior implants on an angle to avoid the sinus cavities in the upper jaw and the nerve canal in the lower jaw.  The cost of the All on 4 procedure varies based on the final prosthetic material. Acrylic resin teeth over titanium bar is substantially cheaper resulting in a total cost of around $30K per arch/jaw in the United States. Premium prosthetic materials like Zirconia can result in a total treatment cost between $36K to $40k per arch/jaw in the United States. For the implementation to be successful a careful analysis of the bone structure needs to be made.  The most ideal way to evaluate the bone is by a cone beam computed tomography (CBCT) scan.  The All-on-4 protocol is for at least four implants to be placed in a jaw.  The back implants are typically angled approximately 30 to 45 degrees from the occlusion (biting plane).  The implant is placed in front of the maxillary sinus in the upper jaw (maxilla), and in front of the mental nerve in the lower jaw (mandible).  The head of the implant emerges in approximately the second premolar position. This will allow a molar tooth to be cantilevered posterior, resulting in a denture or bridge with approximately twelve teeth.

References 

Dentistry
Restorative dentistry
Oral surgery
Articles containing video clips